Russell Todd Goldberg (born March 14, 1958) is an American former film and television actor.

Early life and career
Todd graduated from Troy High School in 1976 and later attended Syracuse University where he studied filmmaking but dropped out in his junior year. After leaving college, Todd worked as a model for the Zoli Agency before moving on to an acting career. He studied acting at the Neighborhood Playhouse.

His film and television acting career includes parts in the films Friday the 13th Part 2, Where the Boys Are '84, Chopping Mall, He Knows You're Alone and roles in television series including High Mountain Rangers Another World, The Bold and the Beautiful and The Young and the Restless.

He left acting in 1997 and now runs an agency for steadicam operators and "A" and "B" camera operators.

He reunited with various cast members from the Friday the 13th films to take part in the documentaries His Name Was Jason: 30 Years of Friday the 13th (2009) and Crystal Lake Memories: The Complete History of Friday the 13th (2013).

Filmography

References

External links
 
 Where Are They Now?: Russell Todd
 Russell Todd Agency

1958 births
Living people
American male film actors
American male television actors
American male soap opera actors
Male actors from New York (state)
Actors from Albany, New York
Male actors from Los Angeles